KMCD (1570 AM) is a commercial radio station serving the Fairfield, Iowa area. KMCD is owned by Alpha Media, through licensee Alpha Media Licensee LLC. The station primarily broadcasts a classic country format.

Effective June 1, 2007 the Fairfield Media Group Inc sold the station to GoodRadio.TV LLC. In December 2013, GoodRadio.TV merged into Digity, LLC. Effective February 25, 2016, Digity and its 124 radio stations were acquired by Alpha Media for $264 million.

External links
KMCD website

MCD
Alpha Media radio stations